Saururus is a genus of plants in the family Saururaceae containing two species. Saururus cernuus is native to North America, and Saururus chinensis is native to Asia.

Fossil record
Several fossil seeds of †Saururus bilobatus have been described from middle Miocene strata of the Fasterholt area near Silkeborg in central Jutland, Denmark.

References

Piperales genera
Saururaceae